Le Charme is a commune in the Loiret department in north-central France.

Geography
The commune is traversed by the river Aveyron.

See also
Communes of the Loiret department

References

Charme